The 2000 Colonial Athletic Association baseball tournament was held at Coy Tillett Sr. Memorial Field in Manteo, North Carolina, from May 16 through 20.  The event determined the champion of the Colonial Athletic Association for the 2000 season.  Second-seeded  won the tournament for the seventh time, and second in a row, and earned the CAA's automatic bid to the 2000 NCAA Division I baseball tournament.

Entering the event, East Carolina had won the most championships, with six.  Old Dominion and Richmond had each won three, while George Mason had won twice.

Format and seeding
The CAA's teams were seeded one to eight based on winning percentage from the conference's round robin regular season.  They played a double-elimination tournament.

Bracket and results

Most Valuable Player
Lee Delfino was named Tournament Most Valuable Player.  Delfino was a shortstop for East Carolina.

References

Tournament
Colonial Athletic Association Baseball Tournament
Colonial Athletic Association baseball tournament
Colonial Athletic Association baseball tournament
Baseball in North Carolina
College sports in North Carolina
Sports competitions in North Carolina
Tourist attractions in Dare County, North Carolina